Bathurst House is an historic building in the English city of York, North Yorkshire. A Grade II* listed building, standing at 86 Micklegate, part of the building dates to around 1727; it was made into three storeys around 1822. The iron railings at the front of the property are part of the listing.

The property was built for Charles and Frances Bathurst. Upon Frances' death, she was buried in the church of St Martin-cum-Gregory across the street. Her tombstone stated she was  "a person of excellent accomplishments both of body and mind, and adorned the several stations of life she went through".

It became a hotel between 1911 and 1921, then York YWCA. The University of York owned it in the 1960s, before it became the home of a firm of chartered accountants, having sold for £1 million in 2017.

References

Micklegate
Houses in North Yorkshire
1727 establishments in England
Grade II* listed buildings in York
Grade II* listed houses